Carlos Pereira Rodrigues (born 5 December 1981), known as Carlitos, is a Portuguese former professional footballer who played as a right back.

Club career
Carlitos was born in Cantanhede, Coimbra District. He began playing football with local amateurs U.D. Tocha, signing in 2001 with Associação Naval 1º de Maio in the second division, where he eventually gained club captaincy.

In the 2005–06 season, both Naval and the player made their debut in the Primeira Liga. Carlitos' first game was a home fixture against FC Porto, and he played the full 90 minutes in a 2–3 defeat.

References

External links

1981 births
Living people
People from Cantanhede, Portugal
Portuguese footballers
Association football defenders
Primeira Liga players
Liga Portugal 2 players
Associação Naval 1º de Maio players
S.C. Farense players
Sportspeople from Coimbra District